Drávagárdony is a village in Somogy county, Hungary.

External links 
 Street map (Hungarian)

References 

Populated places in Somogy County